Jamanka is a large village located in the Gabhana area of Aligarh district in the Indian state of Uttar Pradesh.

Demographics
The population of Jamanka as recorded at the Indian Census of 2011 is 6,366, in 986 households. The male population was 3,341 to 3,025 females, giving a sex ratio of 905 compared to 912 for Uttar Pradesh state. The number of children of age 0-6 is 1,324, comprising 20.80% of the whole population of the village, and the sex ratio among children is 922 (Uttar Pradesh 902).

The literacy rate of Jamanka village has a literacy rate of 63.35%, which is lower than the state average of 67.68%. The literacy rate among males is 75.98%, among females 49.33%.

Governance
Jamanka village is headed by an elected Sarpanch.

References

Villages in Aligarh district